Moeraki was a parliamentary electorate in the Otago region of New Zealand, from 1881 to 1887.

Population centres
The previous electoral redistribution was undertaken in 1875 for the 1875–1876 election. In the six years since, New Zealand's European population had increased by 65%. In the 1881 electoral redistribution, the House of Representatives increased the number of European representatives to 91 (up from 84 since the 1875–76 election). The number of Māori electorates was held at four. The House further decided that electorates should not have more than one representative, which led to 35 new electorates being formed, including Moeraki, and two electorates that had previously been abolished to be recreated. This necessitated a major disruption to existing boundaries.

The electorate was based on the settlement of Moeraki.

History
The electorate was represented by one Member of Parliament, John McKenzie. This was McKenzie's first time in Parliament.

The 1881 election was contested by McKenzie, William Henry Williams (Manager of the Shag Point Colliery) and William Murcott, who received 364, 165 and 130 votes, respectively. McKenzie thus won the election with an absolute majority.

McKenzie and Haynes received 389 and 273 votes, respectively.

He remained in Parliament until 1900, and in 1901 was appointed to the New Zealand Legislative Council shortly before his death.

Election results
Key

Notes

References

Historical electorates of New Zealand
1881 establishments in New Zealand
1887 disestablishments in New Zealand